The Infanta Isabel Clara Eugenia in the Mariemont Park (Spanish: La infanta Isabel Clara Eugenia en el parque de Mariemont) is a large oil on canvas painting by Flemish artists Jan Brueghel the Elder and Joos de Momper. It was painted in the first quarter of the 17th century. The painting is kept in the Museum of Prado in Madrid.

Painting
The oeuvre was part of a collection of 26 paintings which arrived in Madrid in the early 17th century. Some of the paintings, hung in the Torre de la Reina at the Alcázar de Madrid, showed everyday activities of the people of Flanders; other portrayed the archdukes in their landed estates. There were four paintings in the latter group.

To the left there stand the dukes, surrounded by courtladies, children and small sized dogs. To the right there is a group of deer, chased by small sized dogs. The painting seems to represent hunting; however, it does so in a placid, unrealistic way: some deers are resting, and the small sized dogs are not of the breed generally used for hunting.

Differently from the Excursion in the Countryside of Infanta Isabel Clara Eugenia, also by Brueghel and de Momper, dating to the same period, part of the same set, and showing the same gardens in the archdukes' residence of Mariemont, the latter's palace is not visible in the background of this painting. A collection of letters between Isabel Clara Eugenia and the Duke of  Lerma shows the former's passion for the life in the countryside. This painting was commissioned by the archduke out of her enthusiasm for such places.

References

Further reading
 Díaz Padrón, Matías, Museo del Prado: catálogo de pinturas. Escuela flamenca, Museo del Prado; Patrimonio Nacional de Museos, Madrid, 1975, pp. lám. 146.
 Crawford Volk, Mary, Rubens in Madrid & the decoration of the king's summer apartments, THE BURLINGTON MAGAZINE, 123, 1981, pp. 513-529.
 Díaz Padrón, Matías, El siglo de Rubens en el Museo del Prado: catálogo razonado, II, Prensa Ibérica, Barcelona, 1995, pp. 250.
 Vergara, Alejandro, Rubens and his spanish patrons, Cambridge University Press, Cambridge, 1999, pp. 28-32.
 Vergara, Alejandro, The Presence of Rubens in Spain. (Volumes i and II). Tesis D, A Bell & Howell Company, Ann Arbor, 1999, pp. 18-20.
 Ertz, Klaus, Jan Brueghel der Ältere (1568-1625). Kritischer katalog der..., III, Luca Verlag, 2008, pp. 1220-1221.
 Díaz Padrón, Matías, El lienzo de Vertumno y Pomona de Rubens y los cuartos bajos de verano del Alcázar de Madrid, Rubens Picture Ltd, Madrid, 2009, pp. 56-64.
 Posada Kubissa, Teresa, El paisaje nórdico en el Prado: Rubens, Brueghel, Lorena, Museo Nacional del Prado, Madrid, 2011, pp. 88-95.
 Checa, F. Vázquez, E., Maestros flamencos y holandeses., Fundación Carlos de Amberes, Madrid, 2014, pp. 13.
 Pérez Preciado, José Juan, 'Reyes Gobernadores, Nobles, Funcionarios y Artistas. La incesante llegada de obas de arte a España desde los Paises Bajos en el s.XVII', Aragón y Flandes. Un encuentro artístico (siglos XV-XVII), Universidad de Zaragoza, Zaragoza, 2015, pp. 132-142 [134].

External links
The painting at the Museum of Prado

17th-century paintings
Paintings of the Museo del Prado by Flemish artists
Landscape paintings
Paintings by Joos de Momper
Paintings by Jan Brueghel the Elder